At Home with Love (Traditional Chinese: 樓住有情人) is a TVB modern drama series broadcast in October 2006.

Synopsis
Chung Bong (Chung King Fai) left his real estate business Trustworthy Property to his son Chunng Chi Leung (Lawrence Ng). The business has been well established in the area. Through Bong, Elaine Tsui Chi-Ling (Yoyo Mung) becomes a real estate agent working for Leung and they soon fall in love and becomes his girlfriend. The business has been doing well until a large competing firm enters their area, attempting to force them out of business. Leung soon faces many problems: his business, his health, his relationship with his father, and his girlfriend. Will he be able to make it through?

Cast

Viewership ratings

Awards and nominations
39th TVB Anniversary Awards (2006)
 "Best Drama"
 "Best Actor in a Leading Role" (Lawrence Ng - Chung Chi-Leung)
 "Best Actress in a Supporting Role" (Nancy Wu - Cindy Fong Sin-Man)

References

External links
TVB.com At Home with Love - Official Website 
K for TVB.net At Home with Love - Episodic Synopsis and Screen Captures

TVB dramas
2006 Hong Kong television series debuts
2006 Hong Kong television series endings